John Adam Straith (born September 11, 1990) is a Canadian professional soccer player.

Early life
Born in Victoria, British Columbia, Straith attended Oak Bay High School in Victoria but left after grade 11 to attend Burnaby Central Secondary School as part of the Vancouver Whitecaps Residency program in the 2007–08 school year. He has an older brother, George, and a younger brother, Donald.

Career

Youth
Straith played for numerous clubs in Victoria including Bays United, Victoria United, and his Metro Team in the Lower Island Soccer Association, where he was captain. From July 12 to August 3, 2007, he went on trial with the U-19 Junior Bundesliga side of 1860 Munich, along with Antonio Rago. He left Canada in summer 2008, moving to German club Energie Cottbus on a season-long loan deal, after impressing the German club during a one-month trial. In the summer of 2009, Adam left Germany and returned to the Whitecaps but on August 25, 2009 Cottbus exercised its option to sign him for an undisclosed fee.

Professional

Germany
Straith made his senior debut for FC Energie Cottbus in the 2. Bundesliga against FC St. Pauli on October 25, 2009, and scored his first ever goal in Germany in his first game for the club. On December 16, 2009 Straith signed his first professional contract with FC Energie Cottbus tying him to the club until June 30, 2013. He joined 1. FC Saarbrücken on loan in January 2012. He later joined SV Wehen Wiesbaden in 2013.

Fredrikstad
After months without a club, Straith joined Norwegian side Fredrikstad in January 2015.

FC Edmonton
After two years in Norway, Straith joined both Inverness Caledonian Thistle and FC Ordabasy on trials in early 2017. Following his trial in Kazakhstan, Straith signed with North American Soccer League club FC Edmonton for the 2017 Spring Season. Upon the conclusion of the 2017 Spring Season, Straith and the club parted ways.

Sportfreunde Lotte
On August 18, 2017, Straith signed a one-year contract with German 3. Liga side Sportfreunde Lotte, marking his return to Germany after three years. After starting regularly in the 2017–18 season, Straith signed a one-year contract extension to keep him in Lotte until 2019. Straith would excel with Lotte in his second season, captaining the squad and leading them to the fifth best goals against in the league, however offensive struggles resulted in the club being relegated to the Regionalliga.

Hansa Rostock
After two years with Lotte, Straith would sign with fellow 3. Liga club Hansa Rostock on a two-year contract.

International career
Straith was capped for the Canadian U-17 National team which failed to qualify for the U-17 World Cup in South Korea.

He scored his first goal for Canada in Jamaica during the Caribbean Cup, placing the ball in the left corner of the net.

On May 24, 2010, Straith made his senior team debut as an 81st-minute substitute in a 5–0 loss against Argentina at the Estadio Monumental. He played his second game on June 3, 2010 and played 90 minutes vs Venezuela, alongside his teammate Eddy Sidra. He was officially capped by Canada during its World Cup Qualifying match vs St. Lucia on October 7, 2011.

On June 27, 2013 Straith was confirmed as part of the 23-man squad for Colin Miller's Canada squad for the 2013 CONCACAF Gold Cup. He also represented Canada at the 2015 CONCACAF Gold Cup.

On January 22, 2017, following an injury to goalkeeper Sean Melvin, Straith played the final 35 minutes in net for Canada against Bermuda. Canada would win the game 4–2, with Straith making a few saves and keeping a clean sheet. Straith was named to the 2017 CONCACAF Gold Cup squad on June 27, 2017.

Personal life 
In June 2019 he married one time Canada national women's soccer team player Monica Lam Feist, who plays for SV Grün Weiß Rheine in Germany's Kreisliga A. The couple have one child and living outside Rostock's.

Career statistics

Club

References

External links
 
 

1990 births
2013 CONCACAF Gold Cup players
2015 CONCACAF Gold Cup players
2017 CONCACAF Gold Cup players
1. FC Saarbrücken players
2. Bundesliga players
3. Liga players
Association football forwards
Association football midfielders
Canada men's international soccer players
Canada men's youth international soccer players
Canadian expatriate soccer players
Canadian expatriate sportspeople in Germany
Canadian expatriate sportspeople in Norway
Canadian soccer players
Expatriate footballers in Germany
Expatriate footballers in Norway
FC Energie Cottbus players
FC Energie Cottbus II players
FC Hansa Rostock players
Fredrikstad FK players
Living people
Norwegian First Division players
USL League Two players
Sportfreunde Lotte players
Soccer players from Victoria, British Columbia
SV Wehen Wiesbaden players
SV Wehen Wiesbaden II players
Vancouver Whitecaps Residency players
2009 CONCACAF U-20 Championship players